The Dorothy F. Schmidt College of Arts and Letters is one of the ten academic colleges of Florida Atlantic University located in Boca Raton, Florida. The Schmidt College of Arts and Letters offers undergraduate and graduate education focused on the humanities, social sciences, and liberal arts.

Offerings & Departments

Offerings 
The College awards the following degrees:

Undergraduate

 Bachelor of Arts
 Bachelor of Architecture 
 Bachelor of Fine Arts
 Bachelor of Music
 Bachelor of Music Education
 Bachelor of Public Management 
 Bachelor of Public Safety Administration

Graduate

 Master of Arts
 Master of Fine Arts
 Master of Music
 Master of Public Administration
 Master of Nonprofit Management
 Master of Arts in Teaching
 Doctor of Philosophy

In addition to degree programs, the College offers a number of non-degree programs including certificates and professional development.

Departments & Schools
Anthropology
School of Architecture
School of Communication and Multimedia Studies
School of Public Administration
Comparative Studies
English
History
Languages, Linguistics, and Comparative Literature
Music
Philosophy
Political Science
School of Interdisciplinary Studies
Sociology
Theatre and Dance
Visual Arts and Art History
Women Gender and Sexuality Studies

References

External links
Dorothy F. Schmidt College of Arts and Letters
Florida Atlantic University Official Website

Florida Atlantic University
Liberal arts colleges at universities in the United States